Lakomy, Lakomý, or Łakomy is a surname. Notable people with this surname include:

 Paweł Łakomy (born 1975), Polish sprint canoeist
 Petr Lakomý (born 1951), Czech rower
 Reinhard Lakomy (1946–2013), German musician

See also
 

Czech-language surnames
Polish-language surnames
Surnames from nicknames